The Sunni Mosque or the Mukhtarov Mosque is a historic mosque on the left bank of the Terek River in Vladikavkaz, Russia. The mosque owes its name to the Azerbaijani millionaire Murtuza Mukhtarov who financed its construction in 1900–1908. The architect Józef Plośko was inspired by Al-Azhar and other mosques of Cairo. Plośko was also the architect of Mukhtarov Palace in Baku. The mosque serves the Ossetian Muslim minority.

The Sunni Mosque is known for its picturesque setting against the dramatic backdrop of the Caucasus Mountains. It also used to serve the Ingush residents of Vladikavkaz before they were expelled from North Ossetia in the 1990s. The mosque has been protected as a historic landmark since 1934. In 1996, it was badly damaged by an explosion and later restored.

History 
The mosque gets its name from Murtuza Mukhtarov, an Azerbaijani millionaire who constructed the mosque from 1900 to 1908. In 1960, under Soviet rule, it came under complete protection, in which a branch opened an indoor museum. Communism's fall brought the collapse of the Soviet Union, but within dispersion over the gatherings of Ossetian Muslims, the mosque returned to its usual function as a house of worship in 1996.

See also 
 Baku Mosque
Islam in North Ossetia–Alania
Islam in Russia
List of mosques in Russia
List of mosques in Europe

References

External links 
 

Mosques in Russia
Vladikavkaz
Mosques completed in 1908
Buildings and structures in North Ossetia–Alania
1908 establishments in the Russian Empire
Closed mosques in the Soviet Union
Mosque buildings with domes
Mosques in Europe
Józef Płoszko buildings and structures
Culture of North Ossetia–Alania
Cultural heritage monuments in North Ossetia–Alania
Objects of cultural heritage of Russia of federal significance